The Horsham & District Football League is an amateur Australian rules football league based in the Wimmera area of Western Victoria.

History
The league in its present form was created in 1946. Prior to World War 2 a number of local leagues existed around Horsham, shrinking to one in 1934. The clubs that played in the previous incarnation in 1934 were Green Park (which won the premiership), CYMS, Quantong, Adelphians, Church of England, Longerenong and Pimpinio Seconds. The clubs that played in 1946 were Kalkee (which won the premiership), Horsham Homers, Wonwondah, Jung, Wail, Laharum, RSL, Longerenong College, Taylors Lake and YCW.

In 1982 the league expanded after the West Wimmera Football League disbanded and five clubs joined: Goroke, Noradjuha, Douglas-Harrow-Miga Lake, Gerang - Kiata, and Netherby-Lorquon. This brought the total to sixteen clubs. Since then all of these West Wimmera clubs have gone into recess, and Imperials-Wonwondah moved to the Wimmera Football League in 1983.

In 2000, after the folding of the Ararat District Football Association, Stawell Swifts and Great Western joined the competition.

Edenhope-Apsley joined from the Kowree Naracoorte Tatiara Football League in 2007. Natimuk and Horsham Diggers (Wimmera Football League) voted on a merger for 2014 season and beyond under the banner of Natimuk United Football Netball Club. The club wore the Natimuk jumper for home games and Horsham Diggers jumper for away games. They kept scheduling a match on Anzac Day.

Swifts were premiers in 2014 after defeating the previously undefeated Laharum in the grand final.

Laharum defeated Kalkee in the 2015 grand final.

Jeparit-Rainbow transferred from the Mallee Football League for the 2015 season. This caused the Mallee League to fold at the end of the 2015 season.

Consequently Hopetoun and Beulah merged to form the Southern Mallee Giants and transferred to the Horsham & District League in 2016.  They dominated the competition for two seasons without losing a game before transferring to the Wimmera Football League.

Clubs

Current

Past Clubs
Ararat Eagles (2000)
Armoured Car (1939)
Cannum (1969–1970)
Diggers (1946–1961) renamed Imperials
Douglas-Harrow-Miga Lake (1982–1996)
Gerang - Kiata (1982–1999)
Goroke (1982–1998)
Great Western (2002–2010) went into recess, then later reformed and entered the Mininera & District Football League.
Haven (1948–1955)
Homers (1945–1997) renamed North Horsham
Imperials (1962–1976) Merged with Wonwondah
Imperials - Wonwondah (1976–1982) moved to Wimmera Football League in 1983, later renamed Horsham Diggers
Jung (1946–1973)
Longerenong College (1945–1986)
Murtoa Seconds (1948)
Netherby-Lorquon (1982)
Noradjuha (1982–1996) merged with Quantong 
North Horsham (1998)
Quantong (1950–1996) merged with Noradjuha
Southern Mallee Giants (2016-2017) promoted to Wimmera League
St Michaels (1947–1992) moved to Wimmera Football League in 1993, but renamed Horsham Saints
Wail (1945–1948)
Wonwondah (1946–1975) merged with Imperials
YCW (1945–1946) renamed St Michaels

Premierships

	1936	Green Park
	1937	Dimboola Seconds
	1938	Laharum
	1939	Haven
	1945	Wail
	1946	Kalkee
	1947	Kalkee
	1948	Kalkee
	1949	Wonwondah
	1950	St Michaels
	1951	Longerenong
	1952	Taylors Lake
	1953	Wonwondah
	1954	Jung
	1955	Quantong
	1956	Quantong
	1957	Wonwondah
	1958	Laharum
	1959	Laharum
	1960	Quantong
	1961	Quantong
	1962	Laharum
	1963	Laharum
	1964	Laharum
	1965	Homers
	1966	Imperials
	1967	Longerenong

	1968	Jung
	1969	St Michaels
	1970	Longerenong
	1971	Longerenong
	1972	Quantong
	1973	Quantong
	1974	Kalkee
	1975	Natimuk
	1976	Quantong
	1977	Quantong
	1978	Kalkee
	1979	Kalkee
	1980	Imperials-Wonwondah
	1981	St Michaels
	1982	Kalkee
	1983	Kalkee
	1984	Noradjuha
	1985	Rupanyup
	1986	Rupanyup
	1987	Laharum
	1988	St Michaels
	1989	Kalkee
	1990	Rupanyup
	1991	St Michaels
	1992	Homers
	1993	Quantong
	1994	Quantong

	1995	Laharum
	1996	Rupanyup
	1997	Rupanyup
	1998	Rupanyup
	1999	Harrow-Balmoral
	2000	Kalkee
	2001	Rupanyup
	2002	Harrow-Balmoral
	2003	Swifts
	2004	Harrow-Balmoral
	2005	Pimpinio
	2006	Pimpinio
	2007	Harrow-Balmoral
	2008	Kalkee
	2009	Kalkee
	2010	Kalkee
	2011	Kalkee
	2012	Kalkee
	2013	Laharum
	2014	Swifts
	2015	Laharum
	2016	Southern Mallee Gaints
	2017	Southern Mallee Gaints
   2018    Harrow Balmoral
   2019    Harrow Balmoral
   2020 League in recess due to COVID19 pandemic 
   2021 Finals cancelled due to COVID19 pandemic 
   2022   Rupanyup

2014 Ladder

2015 Ladder

2016 Ladder

2017 Ladder

References

External links 
Horsham & District Football League's Official Website

Australian rules football competitions in Victoria (Australia)